The Maharaj Libel Case was an 1862 trial in the Bombay Court (then just in transition from a Supreme Court to a High Court) in British India. The case was against Nanabhai Rustomji Ranina and Karsandas Mulji, they alleged that & their public accusation is that the religious leaders of Pushtimarg had had sexual liaisons with women devotees, & it was libelous for petitioner.

Background

The case arose when the plaintiff, Jadunathji Brijratanji Maharaj, a religious leader, filed a case of libel against a reformer and journalist Karsandas Mulji for writing an article in the newspaper, Satyaprakash, titled . In this article he questioned the values of a Hindu sect called the Pushtimarg or Vallabhacharya Sampradaya. The article was claimed to be libelous by the plaintiff. In particular were accusations that Jadunathji had sexual liaisons with women followers and that men were expected to show their devotion by offering their wives for sex with the religious leaders. The libel case was filed in the Bombay Supreme Court by Jadunathji Maharaj, one of the leaders of the Vallabhacharya sect of the Vaishnavaism on 14 May 1861 against Karsandas Mulji, a social reformer and the editor of Satyaprakash, a Gujarati weekly newspaper, and its publisher Nanabhai Rustomji Ranina, for defaming the plaintiff in an article published on 21 October 1860.

Case and judgement 
The trial of the case in the Supreme Court was before a full court consisting of the Chief Justice Mathew Sausse and Joseph Arnould. The case was followed with great interest by the press and thousands of the general public attended the case in court. In the course of the case, the sect's philosophies were examined and compared with other Hindu texts by missionary orientalist scholars like John Wilson. Doctors, including Bhau Daji, testified to having treated the religious leader for syphilis and several witnesses recounted his erotic escapades. Max Weber examined the religious sect and noted that their path to salvation was based on sexual orgies. The case went in favour of the journalist and Judge Joseph Arnould pronounced that he was only doing his duty as a journalist of exposing the misdeeds of the religious leader. In his own words - "a public journalist is a public teacher: the true function of the press, that by virtue of which it has rightly grown to be one of the great powers of the modern world—is the function of teaching, elevating and enlightening those who fall within the range of its influence."

The case commenced on 25 January 1862 and ended on 4 March 1862. Thirty-one witnesses were examined for the plaintiff and thirty-three for the defendant. The judgment was given on 22 April 1862 in favour of the defendant, Karsandas Mulji. The plaintiff was asked to pay Rs. 11,500 to Karsandas, who had to bear a cost of Rs 13,000.

A related case was the Bhatia Conspiracy case which arose when Gokuldas Liladhar and eight others were accused of intimidating and preventing witnesses from providing evidence against Jadunathji.

Reaction
The libel case stirred unprecedented interest in the public. Karsandas Mulji's efforts and the court decision received praise from the liberals and the press. For his part, Mulji was cited by the local English presses as 'Indian Luther', after the Christian reformer Martin Luther.

In popular culture 
Saurabh Shah, Gujarati author and journalist, has written a novel titled Maharaj based on the case which was awarded the Nandshankar award by the Narmad Sahitya Sabha.

Maitri Goswami, Dhawal Patel et al., have written a book titled Doctrines of Pushtibhaktimarga: Allegations, Conspiracies and Facts (In context of Maharaj Libel Case) based on the case.

References

External links 
 Lukhmidass, D. (1911) Maharaj libel case, including Bhattia conspiracy case, No. 12047 of 1861.
Report of the Maharaj Libel Case and of the Bhattia Conspiracy case connected with it. (1862)
 Historical Cases - Maharaj Libel Case, 1862
 Blog series on the case

Bombay High Court
Legal history of India